MSX may refer to:
 MSX, a computer standard
 Meditran SX, heavy duty diesel oil from Pertamina
 MSX, a disease caused by the Haplosporidium nelsoni pathogen of oysters
 Metal Slug X, a video game
 Midcourse Space Experiment, an infrared satellite telescope
 MSX, IATA code for Mossendjo Airport in the Republic of the Congo
 MSx, a management program at Stanford University